The Illini and Saluki are a pair of passenger trains operated by Amtrak along a  route between Chicago and Carbondale, Illinois. They are part of Amtrak's Illinois Service and are primarily funded by the state of Illinois. The route is coextensive with the far northern leg of the long-distance City of New Orleans. The Illini has operated since 1973; a previous version operated in 1971–1972 between Chicago and Champaign. The Saluki debuted in 2006.

History 

The Illinois Central Railroad's main line between Chicago and New Orleans ran through Champaign–Urbana and Carbondale, along the east side of Illinois. At the formation of Amtrak in 1971, the Illinois Central still operated a number of services from its Central Station in Chicago over this route, including the Illini and Shawnee (Chicago-Carbondale), the City of New Orleans and the Panama Limited (both, Chicago–New Orleans), plus the City of Miami (Chicago–Birmingham).

Amtrak retained two trains on this route: the City of New Orleans (which it named the Panama Limited) and the Shawnee. Amtrak brought back the Illini name on November 14, 1971, as a Chicago-Champaign train, operating in conjunction with the Campus. It was named for the Illini, from which the state of Illinois and the Fighting Illini mascot of the University of Illinois at Urbana–Champaign get their names. Amtrak discontinued the Campus and Illini on March 5, 1972. Both trains used Central Station, which Amtrak was abandoning; Amtrak judged that the additional 35–40 minutes necessary to serve Union Station made the schedule impractical. The 1972 Illini made its last trip on March 3.

Amtrak revived the Illini on December 19, 1973, again as a Chicago–Champaign service. The restoration was part of $1.5 million expansion program which included the Black Hawk (Chicago–Rockford–Dubuque), the State House (St. Louis–Chicago), and supplemental funding for the Rock Island's two remaining Rockets (Chicago–Peoria and Chicago–Rock Island). The state desired to extend the Illini to Decatur, but doing so involved a switch from the Illinois Central to the Norfolk & Western at Tolono, south of Champaign. The connection between the lines was in poor condition, and no one would take responsibility for repairing it.

Amtrak finally extended the Illini to Decatur on July 2, 1981. Decatur had last seen service in 1971 from the Norfolk & Western's City of Decatur (Chicago–Decatur) and the Wabash's Wabash Cannon Ball (Detroit–St. Louis). Neither train had been retained by Amtrak. The new Amtrak service used the old Wabash station, which  still stands and has become an antique store. Poor ridership prompted Illinois to withdraw its support for the Decatur stop, and Amtrak cut the Illini back to Champaign on July 10, 1983.

On January 12, 1986, Amtrak extended the Illini to Carbondale to replace the Shawnee, which had been canceled because of budget cuts. Service began at Gilman on October 26, 1986, and Du Quoin on August 25, 1989. The Illini service was nearly canceled in 1996, but local communities along the route pledged funds to keep it running.

A second train, the Saluki, was added on October 30, 2006, in response to increased demand on the Illini and other Illinois Service trains in the 2005–2006 fiscal year. The Saluki was named for the mascot of Southern Illinois University, which is located in the train's southern terminus of Carbondale. Its morning schedule complements the afternoon schedule of the Illini.

Amtrak ran an extra over the route, the Eclipse Express, for the solar eclipse of August 21, 2017.

The trains have stops near three major Illinois state universities: University of Illinois at Urbana-Champaign, Southern Illinois University, and Eastern Illinois University in Charleston (near Mattoon). As a result, university students account for a significant portion of passengers.

Route 

The Illini and Saluki operates over the Canadian National Railway, successor to the Illinois Central.

The Chicago Region Environmental and Transportation Efficiency Program (CREATE) is in the preliminary design phase for the Grand Crossing Project. This project will reroute the Illini, Saluki, and City of New Orleans trains from Canadian National Railway's tracks to Norfolk Southern's Chicago Line in the Greater Grand Crossing neighborhood in Chicago. This will eliminate a time-consuming switchback on the St. Charles Air Line into Chicago Union Station.

Station Stops

Ridership

Equipment 

In 2021 a typical Illini or Saluki consists of:
1 Siemens Charger locomotive
1 Cafe/Sightseeing car
4 Superliner cars

References

Notes

External links 

Amtrak routes
Passenger rail transportation in Illinois
Railway services introduced in 1973
Railway services introduced in 2006
1973 establishments in Illinois